Honorine may refer to:

 Honorina (French: Honorine), French saint
 Honorine (novel), 1843 novel by Balzac
 Honorine Lake, in Lac-Jacques-Cartier, La Côte-de-Beaupré Regional County Municipality, Capitale-Nationale, Quebec, Canada

See also
 Conflans-Sainte-Honorine, a commune in the Yvelines department in north-central France